Nauruan may refer to:

 Something of, from, or related to the country of Nauru
 Nauruan people, persons from Nauru, or of Nauruan descent
 Culture of Nauru
 Nauruan language

See also 
 

Language and nationality disambiguation pages